Lightning Fish Games was a video game developer based in Banbury, Oxfordshire. It was founded in 2008 by the owners of Chromativity to develop games that would capitalize on motion controls utilized by seventh-generation consoles, namely the Wii's Wii Remote and Wii MotionPlus, the PlayStation 3's PlayStation Move and the Xbox 360's Kinect.

Games developed

References

External links
Official website
Lightning Fish's profile from MobyGames

Video game companies established in 2008
Companies based in Banbury
Defunct video game companies of the United Kingdom
Video game development companies